Vyacheslav Yosypovych Medvid (born on 28 August 1965) is a former Soviet and Ukrainian footballer.

See also
 Fedir Medvid

External links 
 
 Vyacheslav Medvid. Magyar Football.
 1985 Soviet Union junior team. Fates. (Молодежная сборная СССР 1985 года. Судьбы.) Euro.com. 26 February 2012

1965 births
Living people
Ukrainian footballers
Soviet Top League players
FC Hoverla Uzhhorod players
FC Metalist Kharkiv players
PFC CSKA Moscow players
FC SKA-Karpaty Lviv players
FC Halychyna Drohobych players
Ukrainian Premier League players
FC Nyva Ternopil players
Ukrainian expatriate footballers
Expatriate footballers in Hungary
Nemzeti Bajnokság I players
Debreceni VSC players
Association football midfielders
Sportspeople from Zakarpattia Oblast